Sumitra Mangesh Katre (Prof. S. M. Katre) (11 April 1906 – 21 October 1998), a lexicographer, Indo Aryan and Paninian linguist, was born at Honnavar, Karnataka and died in San Jose, California, USA. Katre initiated the gigantic Sanskrit Dictionary Project, An Encyclopedic Dictionary of Sanskrit on Historical Principles, with its 11 million slips preserved in the scriptorium.

His work The Formation of Konkani is his tribute to his mother tongue Konkani. S. M. Katre’s 1966 work, The Formation of Konkani, which used the instruments of modern historical and comparative linguistics across six typical Konkani dialects, showed the formation of Konkani to be distinct from that of Marathi. He was president of the 7th Session of the All India Konkani Parishad held 27–28 April 1957 at Mumbai.

References

Bibliography
 A glossary of grammatical elements and operations in Aṣṭādhyāyī. Ed. Central Institute of Indian Languages, 1981
 Aṣṭādhyāyī of Pāṇini. Ed. Motilal Banarsidass Publ., 1989. 
 Dictionary of Pāṇini: Gaṇapātha. Ed. Deccan College Postgraduate and Research Institute, Poona, 1971
 Problems of Reconstruction in Indo-Aryan, Indian Institute of Advanced Study, Simla, 1968
 The Formation of Konkani, Deccan College Postgraduate and Research Institute, Poona, 1966
 Some Problems of Historical Linguistics in Indo-Aryan, Deccan College Postgraduate and Research Institute, Poona, 1965
 Prakrit Languages and Their Contribution to Indian Culture, Deccan College Postgraduate and Research Institute, Poona, 1964

1906 births
1998 deaths
Indian lexicographers
Indian emigrants to the United States
20th-century Indian linguists
Scientists from Karnataka
People from Uttara Kannada
20th-century lexicographers